Kaev may refer to the following places in Cambodia:
Bar Kaev District
Kak Commune, Bar Kaev District 
Doun Kaev District
Kaev Seima District